Wang Zhenghao (born 28 June 2000) is a Chinese professional footballer who currently plays as a defender for Tianjin TEDA.

Club career
Wang Zhenghao would be promoted to the senior team of Tianjin TEDA within the 2019 Chinese Super League season and would make his debut in league game on 3 March 2019 against Jiangsu Suning F.C. in a 3–2 defeat.

Career statistics

References

External links

2000 births
Living people
Chinese footballers
Association football defenders
Chinese Super League players
Tianjin Jinmen Tiger F.C. players